The Collier County Public Schools (or District School Board of Collier County) is a school district in Collier County, Florida.  The district has schools in four cities throughout the county: Everglades City, Immokalee, Marco Island, and Naples.  The district employees approximately 3,200 teachers, 49% of whom have advanced degrees.  The district includes 58 schools: 29 elementary schools, 10 middle schools, 8 high schools, along with 7 charter schools, two technical schools educating adult or dually-enrolled high school students, and 5 alternative schools. The district has an 'A' overall grade.

History
Gulfview Middle School was the first school to open in Naples in 1938.

Until the end of the 1950s, the school district did not provide a high school for African-American students in Naples. Students who wished to attend high school were bused to Fort Myers, and later to Immokalee, to get an education. In the 1950s, elementary schools for black children were opened, and by adding grades every year, eventually reached the high school level. In 1959, George Washington Carver High School was opened with two teachers. In the mid-1960s, the district moved Carver teacher Herbert Cambridge to Naples High School, which was the districts first experience with integration. In 1968 the black students were reassigned to white schools and Carver was closed.

Censorship of books as "unsuitable for students" 
In February 2022, the school district placed warning labels on over 100 books in its libraries declaring them as "unsuitable for students" in response to a report issued by a far-right group.  The Heritage Foundation, a conservative think tank, noted that the labels prevented teachers from exercising their "responsibility to decide what content is age-appropriate when they choose what to teach in class."

High schools 
 Aubrey Rogers High
 Barron Collier High
 eCollier Virtual Academy
 Golden Gate High School
 Gulf Coast High
 Immokalee High School
 Lely High School
 Lorenzo Walker Technical High
 Naples High School
 Palmetto Ridge High

Middle schools
 East Naples Middle
 Golden Gate Middle
 North Naples Middle
 Manatee Middle
 Pine Ridge Middle
 Corkscrew Middle
 Cypress Palm Middle
 Everglades City
 Immokalee Middle
 Oakridge Middle
 Gulfview Middle

Elementary schools 
 Avalon Elementary
 Big Cypress Elementary
 Calusa Park Elementary
 Corkscrew Elementary
Eden Park Elementary
Estates Elementary
 Golden Gate Elementary Intermediate (3-5)
 Golden Gate Elementary Primary (K-2)
 Golden Terrace Elementary Intermediate (3-5)
 Golden Terrace Elementary Primary (K-2)
 Highlands Elementary
 Lake Park Elementary
 Lake Trafford Elementary
 Laurel Oak Elementary
 Lely Elementary
 Manatee Elementary
 Mike Davis Elementary
 Naples Park Elementary
 Osceola Elementary
 Palmetto Elementary
 Parkside Elementary
 Pelican Marsh Elementary
 Pinecrest Elementary
 Poinciana Elementary
 Sabal Palm Elementary
 Sea Gate Elementary
 Shadowlawn Elementary
 Tommie Barfield Elementary
 Veterans Memorial Elementary
 Village Oaks Elementary
 Vineyards Elementary

Charter Schools 

 Marco Island Charter Middle School (6-8)
 Collier Charter Academy (K-8)
 Gulf Coast Charter Academy (K-8)
 BridgePrep Academy (K-8)
 Immokalee Community School (K-6)
 Marco Island Academy (9-12)
Everglades City School (VPK-12)

Alternative schools/sites 
 Beacon High School
 Collier Regional Juvenile Detention Center*
 New Beginnings (Naples & Immokalee)
 Phoenix Program (Naples and Immokalee)
 Teen Parenting Program
 Partnership with the Florida Department of Juvenile Justice.

Ethnic groups

Male - 52%
Female - 48%
Hispanic - 52%
White - 33%
Black - 11%
Other- 4%

References

External links

 

Collier County
Education in Collier County, Florida
Organizations with year of establishment missing